Smitha Rajan (born in 1969) is an Indian Mohiniyattam performer from Kerala and granddaughter of the Indian classical dancer couple of Padma Shri Kalamandalam Krishnan Nair and Kalamandalam Kalyanikutty Amma.

Biography
Smitha Rajan started her training in dance at her maternal grandparents' residence in Tripunithura off Kochi. As a child, Smitha was surrounded by dance and music. Smitha's aunt, Kala Vijayan (a recipient of the Kerala Sangeetha Nataka Akademi Award for Mohiniyattam) was the first to notice talent in young Smitha. During a master class at her grandparents' institution, Kerala Kalalayam in Tripunithura, her aunt saw Smitha performing a full Cholkettu (the first item in a typical Mohiniyattam repertoire) along with the senior students. From then, Guru Kala Vijayan started training her in Bharatanatyam. Smitha did her Arangetram in Bharatanatyam at the age of 4. Her mother, Guru Sreedevi Rajan, taught Smitha her first lessons in Mohiniyattam and Smitha performed her Arangetram in Mohiniyattam at the age of 6. She later mastered Mohiniyattam under the guidance of her grandmother.

Her grandfather, Guru Kalamandalam Krishnan Nair, taught her Kathakali and fine-tuned her Mukhajabhinaya (facial expressions). Smitha has also undergone training in classical Carnatic music under Professor Kalyanasundaram. She taught at her parents' institution, Kerala Kalalayam, from 1983 to 1990.

Smitha has performed with many classical dancers of India in dance styles such as Bharatanatyam, Odissi, and Kuchipudi.

She turned into professional dancer at the age of 12. In 1980, Smitha accompanied her grandmother, her mother, and her aunt to popularize Mohiniyattam in India and other countries. She was the leading performer of Kerala Kalalayam from 1979 to 1992. She has assisted her mother, grandmother and her aunt in teaching Mohiniyattam to a number of today's Mohiniyattam performers. In 2014, she received the Kerala Sangeetha Nataka Akademi Award.

Today, Smitha lives in St. Louis, Missouri, along with her family and is running the institution Nrithyakshetra "Temple of Dance" as a branch of the institution Guru Sreedevi Rajan had started at Kochi, in association with the parent institution Kerala Kalalayam.

She produced as well as appeared in the 2019 documentary on Kalamandalam Kalyanikutty Amma titled "Mother of Mohiniyattam" which was directed by Dr. Vinod Mankara.

References

Living people
Mohiniyattam exponents
Artists from Kochi
Indian female classical dancers
Performers of Indian classical dance
1969 births
Dancers from Kerala
Kathakali exponents
Bharatanatyam exponents
20th-century Indian dancers
20th-century Indian women artists
Women artists from Kerala
Recipients of the Kerala Sangeetha Nataka Akademi Award